George Walter "Bunky" Henry Jr. (February 8, 1944 – August 17, 2018) was an American professional golfer who played on the PGA Tour in the 1960s and 1970s.

Born in Valdosta, Georgia, Henry attended Georgia Tech in Atlanta on a football scholarship, and also played on the Yellow Jackets' golf team. He turned professional in 1967 and played on the PGA Tour for 12 years.

Henry's career year in professional golf was 1969, when he won the National Airlines Open Invitational, and had his two best finishes in majors: solo ninth at the U.S. Open and T-11 at the PGA Championship. 

Henry began play at age fifty on the Senior PGA Tour in 1994, and his best finish was a tie for third at the Boone Valley Classic in Missouri in 1996.

Henry was inducted into the Georgia Golf Hall of Fame in 2008.

Henry died on August 17, 2018 at the age of 74.

Amateur wins
1960 Georgia State Junior Jaycee Championship
1961 Golden Isles Invitational, Okeefenokee Invitational
1962 Southern Amateur
1965 Canadian Amateur
1966 Peach Blossom
1967 Peach Blossom

Professional wins (1)

PGA Tour wins (1)

See also 

 1967 PGA Tour Qualifying School graduates

References

External links

American male golfers
Georgia Tech Yellow Jackets men's golfers
PGA Tour golfers
PGA Tour Champions golfers
Golfers from Georgia (U.S. state)
Georgia Tech Yellow Jackets football players
People from Valdosta, Georgia
1944 births
2018 deaths